Arancou is a commune in the Pyrénées-Atlantiques department in southwestern France.

It is located in the former province of Lower Navarre.

Geography

Hydrography
The Lauhirasse, a tributary of the Bidouze, and the Baniou, a tributary of the Gave de Pau cross this commune.

Hamlets
 Garai
 Le Burrou
 Xabai

Bordering communes
 Came to the Northwest
 Labastide-Villefranche to the East
 Bergouey-Viellenave to the Southwest

Toponymy
The Gascon name for "Arancou" is Arancon; the Basque name is Erango.

The name Arancou appears in the forms Arranque (1119–1136), Arancoen (13th century), Arancoey, Arancoenh (around 1360), Arrancoeynh, Arancoinh (1372), Aranquoen (1403, titles of Came), and Aranco (1584, alienation of the Diocese of Dax).

The name of Arancou comes from the Basque arangoien, for "higher valley".

History

Prehistory
Tools from the Magdalenian era, one of the later cultures of the Upper Paleolithic era of Western Europe, were found in the Bourrouillan cave in the territory of Arancou.  Several thousand bones from hunted animals were found in the cave, as well as thousands of flint and bone tools.

Modern history
On January 1, 1973, the communes of Arancou, Bergouey, and Viellenave-sur-Bidouze were joined together.  On 15 November 1977, Arancou regained its independent status, while Bergouey and Viellenave-sur-Bidouze remained together.

Arancou and Basque country
Jean-Baptiste Orpustan mentions Arancou in 1309 in a list of parishes paying dues to the royal power in Navarrenx.  Arancou was also mentioned by Eugène Goyheneche towards the end of the Middle Ages.  He wrote that "because of the Gramont's power, [the situation of the neighboring parishes, including Arancou] is ambiguous."

However, starting with the modern age, no evidence of Arancou's allegiance to the Kingdom of Navarre can be found.  Nor is there evidence of any links to the dukedom of Gramont or of the sovereign principality of Bidache.  The chapter of the collegiate Saint-Jacques de Bidache was the lord of the lands; the parish was situated in France in the administrative district of Lannes, where it came under the control of the administrative region of Hastingues.

Although Arancou falls without a doubt within modern districting, it is nonetheless included in a list of the communes of Basse-Navarre.  While presenting the town in 2009 on his website, the mayor, Alexandre Bordes, did not take sides.  Rather, he emphasized the "mix of deep-rooted cultures" and the "location of the town at the borders of Gascogne, Béarn, Basque Country, and the Navarre."  His website describes the town as "basquo-béarnais."

Administration
List of Mayors

Intercommunality
Arancou belongs to four different intercommunal territories:
 The Communauté d'agglomération du Pays Basque
 The Adour Syndicate
 Syndicate AEP of Arancou - Bergouey-Viellenave - Bidache - Labastide-Villefranche
 Syndicate for the department of electricity

Population

Economy
Arancou's economy is primarily agricultural. Arancou is part of the Appellation d'origine contrôlée (a French regional certification) of the cheese, Ossau-Iraty.

There is a limestone quarry in Arancou. Until 1993, it provided the stone for the cemetery, Ciments de l'Adour, in Boucau. The stone was carried in barges down the Bidouze and Adour rivers.

Sights

Civil Heritage
 Farms and houses from the 17th and 18th centuries,
 A farm from the 18th century in the lieu-dit Chabay,
 The well, wash-house, and fountain of Garay.

Religious Heritage
The church of l'Assomption-de-la-Bienheureuse-Vierge-Marie from the 13th century is listed as an historical monument. It has characteristics of both Romanesque and Gothic architecture. The church is located on the road, Saint-Jacques-de-Compostelle (Via Turonensis). A wellspring runs underneath the church, feeding a washing-place in the basement. An 18th century Madonna statue called Notre-Dame-d'Arancou can be found in the church, as well as an hilarri (a disk-shaped funeral stele) from Labets-Biscay, and 
different furnishings registered in the inventory of the Minister of Culture (a tabernacle, font, and cross). The church also has a registered stained glass window.

See also
Communes of the Pyrénées-Atlantiques department

References

Communes of Pyrénées-Atlantiques
Lower Navarre